Querétaro is a state in Mexico.

Querétaro may also refer to:
Querétaro, Querétaro, the capital and largest city in Querétaro
Querétaro FC, a Mexican football club
Diocese of Querétaro
Conspiracy of Querétaro, precursor to the 1810 Battle of Monte de las Cruces in the Mexican War of Independence